Ilona Andrews is the pen name of Ilona Gordon and Andrew Gordon, an American husband-and-wife duo who write urban fantasy and romantic fiction together under a portmanteau of their first names.

Early lives
Ilona Gordon was born in the Soviet Union and immigrated to the United States as a teenager to attend private school. She attended Western Carolina University, majoring in biochemistry and it was there she met her future husband and writing partner, Andrew Gordon.

Andrew Beauregard Gordon was born in Florida, U.S., and spent part of his childhood in the Appalachia region of North Carolina. He explained in one interview that he was named after the confederate general P. G. T. Beauregard who fired on Fort Sumter and started the American Civil War, but most often chooses to goes by his last name "Gordon" since that is what he went by during his military service. Andrew served four years in the United States Navy as a communications officer. 

He attended Western Carolina University to study history and political science where he met Ilona in a writing course and they began collaborating and editing one another's work and essays. Gordon's studies in history and mythology and Ilona's knowledge of Slavic folktales went on to influence the world building and inspiration behind their bestselling novels.

Early career
According to interviews and their own recollection of their early publishing history, Ilona and Andrew were interested in publishing novels as early as their college years. In a recollection of their publishing journey on their website, Ilona recalls that after completing drafts of two novels, she attempted to get traditionally published with very little prior knowledge and it went very poorly. In one interview, Ilona recalls attempting to write a "horrible ninja hobbit novel" that ended up being rejected for publication. Similarly, Andrew stated that he wrote a failed "James Bond-y fantasy" series that eventually ended up partially inspiring parts of their future novel Bayou Moon (2010).

Ilona  started writing what would eventually become the first entry in the Kate Daniels series as early as 2002, but it went through multiple edits before they managed to find a literary agent and get published. One publisher rejected it on the basis that it was too similar to the Anita Blake series by Laurell K. Hamilton. The novel went through multiple stages and various cycles of rejection, and Gordon helped Ilona rewrite one of her discarded submissions into "Lost Dog" which was eventually accepted and published as their first novel Magic Bites (2007).

Reception 
Their first novel, Magic Bites (2007) was released to good reviews and decent sales. And it's sequel, Magic Burns, reached even greater success, managing to reach the #32 spot on the New York Times extended bestseller list in April 2008. Since their debut they have published at least 30 novels, in addition to dozens of additional novellas and short stories. Their novels have reached #1 on the NYT and Wall Street Journal's Bestseller Lists, and #2 on the USA Today Bestseller List, with over 3.5 million of their books in print and foreign rights sold in at least 18 countries.

After the immense success of the first book in the Aurelia Ryder series, Blood Heir (2021), they have indicated that they are considering moving away from traditional publishing contracts in the future since they now have a large enough audience to make a living off of self-publishing.

Personal lives
The Gordons live in Texas, they write a highly successful blog chronicling their lives, the publication process, and post snippets of free fiction and serial novels. They have two adult daughters, anonymized as Kid 1 and Kid 2 on their site. Their blog posts include fan engagement, polls, recipes, stories, publishing advice and updates about their current works in progress. 

In the lively comments sections of their website, they are known as Ilona or Gordon and collectively as House Andrews, while their fans have adopted the nickname of "BDH" or "Book Devouring Horde" as a play on the Hope Crushing Horde from their Innkeeper book series.

Works

Kate Daniels (2007 - 2023)
Kate Daniels is an Urban Fantasy series that was published under the Ace Books imprint of Penguin Random House from 2007 to 2018. An additional novella titled Magic Tides was self-published on January 17, 2023 after the end of the main series.

The series is set in a post-magic apocalypse version of Atlanta, where the world switches between periods of magical and technological dominance, and follows Kate Daniels, a sarcastic mercenary who makes a living dealing with a vast array of magical and mythological creatures. The series follows Kate as she navigates the various factions of shifters, necromancers, magic users and magic-based organizations that hold power in the city.

The various entries in the series include conflicts with monsters, gods and beings from Slavic, Celtic, Islamic, Jewish, indigenous, Hindu, Greek, Nordic, Babylonian and Assyrian mythologies. Featuring beings such as upir, formorians, djinn, golems, wendigo, rakshasa, greek gods, draugr, and lamassu alongside a modern take on werewolves and vampires.

Iron Covenant (2018 -  ) 
The Iron Covenant is an ongoing spinoff novel series set in the Kate Daniels World, published independently through NYLA, which follows Hugh D'Ambray, a character who previously featured as a villain in the main Kate Daniels series. The series takes place between the events of Magic Binds and Magic Triumphs and follows former warlord Hugh and his army, The Iron Dogs, as they attempt to move on from their dark past by creating an alliance with a colony of druids ruled by Elara Harper, a powerful and dangerous witch with unknown and terrible powers.

Ilona Andrews originally stated the series would likely eventually be a trilogy. The release of the second book in the series has been delayed with no current date of expected publication.

Aurelia Ryder (2018 -  ) 
A second spinoff of the Kate Daniels World, featuring Kate's adoptive daughter Julie Lennart-Olsen, now going by the name Aurelia Ryder. Taking place 6 years after the events of the main Kate Daniels series, the Aurelia Ryder series follows Aurelia's return to post-apocalyptic Atlanta as she attempts to solve a series of murders and comes face to face with a changed version of a man she once loved.

The first novel in the series, Blood Heir (2021) began as a serial work on the Ilona Andrews blog in 2020 originally titled "Ryder" and was later edited for self-publication. Despite being self published, Blood Heir climbed to the #5 combined print and ebook fiction ranking on the New York Times Fiction Bestsellers List and #2 on the USA Today Bestseller's List shortly after publication.

The Edge (2009 - 2012)
The Edge is a completed urban fantasy series under the Ace Books imprint of Penguin Random House. The series is built on the premise that there is a magic parallel world called "the Weird" that exists adjacent to the continental United States, as well as a lawless buffer region between the two realms known as "the Edge" where the mundane and magic collide. The series follows multiple couples on adventures of espionage and survival through the Edge and beyond as they come up against a variety of dangerous factions and forces. 

Four characters from Edge cross-over to the Innkeeper series - George, Gaston, Jack and Lark/Sophie Camarine - but no mention or explanation of the link between the two "universes" is made in that series.

The Kinsmen Universe  (2009 - 2021)
The Kinsmen Universe is an unconnected series of self-published novellas set in a sci-fi spacefaring future where human genetic modification has resulted in a select few families possessing deadly and dangerous abilities. These families, known as "Kinsmen", run vast corporate empires and compete amongst one another for business and power. Each novella follows a different action-packed romantic pairing within this world of cutthroat sci-fi politics.

The Innkeeper Chronicles (2013 -  )
The ongoing Innkeeper Chronicles series is composed of a variety of novellas and self-published novels that all started as free weekly online serials on Ilona Andrews' blog. Each entry in the series is published for free before being edited and published as a novel or novella.

The Innkeeper Chroncles is a sci-fi and fantasy series which follows Dina Demille, a young woman who presides over an old Victorian mansion and bed and breakfast called Gertrude Hunt in the quiet town of Red Deer, Texas. Gertrude Hunt is secretly an intergalactic waypoint known as an "inn" that offers refuge and lodging for a vast variety of extraterrestrial visitors during their visits to Earth. Dina is joined by a colourful cast of characters and strange extraterrestrial guests including a former wanted intergalactic tyrant named Caldenia, her monstrous and adorable Shih Tzu, a race of warlike space vampires known as the Holy Cosmic Anocracy, and a persistent and attractive war veteran named Sean Evans who turns out to be a genetically modified werewolf. Throughout the series Dina must balance the standing of her business, the safety of her guests and continue to conceal the truth of the greater galaxy from other humans, all while dealing with the needs, agendas and threats posed by her many guests and enemies.

The Innkeeper Chronicles has been received well by fans and readers of Ilona Andrews' blog. Due to the weekly format, the comments sections of each blog entry receive large amounts of comments and fan engagement.

In 2022, the first novel of the series Clean Sweep was adapted into an ongoing webtoon on the online comics platform Tapas in collaboration with Tapas Media, Kisai Entertainment, webtoon artist Shinju Ageha, and writer ChrossxXxRodes, with a planned initial run of 52 webcomic chapters.

The Hidden Legacy (2014 - 2022)
Hidden Legacy is an urban fantasy romance series published under the Avon imprint of HarperCollins publishing between 2014 and 2022. The series is set in a fictional version of the United States where magical abilities were introduced into the population in the 1800s through the discovery of the Osiris Serum, a concoction that gave users inheritable magic abilities. Centuries later, the Osiris Serum has been banned but the world is ruled by magical dynasties called Houses, who marry for magic, maintain private armies, and own global corporations. Magical Houses are ruthless and cunning and constantly engage in competition and warfare with one another similar to the warring families of Rennaissance Italy.

The series follows the daughters of the Baylor family; Nevada, Catalina, and Arabella, who run Baylor Investigative Agency in Houston, Texas, a small family private detective firm inherited from their deceased father. However, after the eldest daughter Nevada is assigned one fateful job, the entire family is swept into the cutthroat world of Primes, politics and the magical elite, and end up getting entangled with very dangerous (and very attractive) men in the process.

Anthologies and collections

Short stories and assorted publications
 Alphas: Origins (2016), NYLA,  (novella)
 A Small Blue Key
 George and Jack in School
 Questing Beast (2010)  (free short story)
 A Mere Formality (2011)

References

External links 
 
 Reviews of work by Andrews at Fantasy Literature
 
 

American fantasy writers
American romantic fiction novelists
Married couples
Collective pseudonyms
Pseudonymous women writers
Living people
Soviet emigrants to the United States
Western Carolina University alumni
21st-century American novelists
21st-century American women writers
Year of birth missing (living people)
Urban fantasy writers
21st-century pseudonymous writers